Eastbridge is a village in the English county of Suffolk. It borders the Minsmere River which cuts through an area of drained and undrained wetland known as the Minsmere Level.

Eastbridge Windpump, which stood on the Minsmere Level marshes, is preserved at the Museum of East Anglian Life in Stowmarket. The marshes are also the site of the remains of the medieval chapel of St Mary which stands on the original site of Leiston Abbey. The chapel ruins date from the 12th-century and include a World War II pill box which was built into the walls to protect against invasion. The site is a scheduled monument.

Located in Eastbridge is the Eels Foot Inn, an ale-house dating as far back as 1533 which obtained a full license to sell alcohol in 1950. Because of its proximity to the sea, the pub was a favourite stop of travellers, drovers and smugglers. The pub is the main feature of the small village. It is associated with folk music, and hosts a weekly gathering in which people sing songs and play folk tunes.

References

External links

Villages in Suffolk
Suffolk Coastal